Pierre Georges Édouard Bartholomée (Brussels, 5 August 1937) is a Belgian conductor and composer.

Career 
He began his musical studies at the age of six with piano lessons. Later on he graduated from the Royal Conservatory of Brussels, where he received a piano education by André Dumortier and where he won several prizes. His education was completed with a series of Beethoven piano performance classes given by Wilhelm Kempff.

Together with Henri Pousseur, he founded the Ensemble Musique Nouvelle and the Centre de Recherches et de Création Musicales de Wallonie. He has performed internationally as a pianist and a conductor.

Honours 
 1999 : created Knight Bartholomée, by king Albert II.
 2004 : Member of the Royal Academy of Science, Letters and Fine Arts of Belgium.
 2011 : President of the Royal Academy of Science, Letters and Fine Arts of Belgium.
 Officer of the Order of the Crown.
 Knight of the  Ordre national du Mérite.

References
 Koninklijk Conservatorium Brussel now houses most works and manuscripts of Bartholomée, after the bankruptcy of CeBeDeM in 2015.

Musicians from Brussels
1937 births
Living people
Belgian conductors (music)
Belgian male musicians
Male conductors (music)
Belgian opera composers
Male opera composers
Belgian classical pianists
Royal Conservatory of Brussels alumni
Academic staff of the Royal Conservatory of Brussels
Officers of the Order of the Crown (Belgium)
Belgian knights
Knights of the Ordre national du Mérite
President of the Royal Academy of Belgium
Male classical pianists
21st-century conductors (music)
21st-century classical pianists
21st-century male musicians